Crotalus is a genus of venomous pit vipers in the family Viperidae, known as rattlesnakes or rattlers. The genus is found only in the Americas from southern Canada to northern Argentina, and member species are colloquially known as rattlesnakes. The generic name Crotalus is derived from the Greek word  krótalοn, which means "rattle" or "castanet", and refers to the rattle on the end of the tail, which makes this group (genera Crotalus and Sistrurus) so distinctive. Currently, 32 to 62 species are recognized as being valid.

Description
In general, adult males are slightly larger than females. Compared to most snakes, they are heavy-bodied, although some African vipers are much thicker. Most forms are easily recognized by the characteristic rattle on the end of their tails, although a few island populations form exceptions to this rule: C. catalinensis has lost its rattle entirely, Crotalus lorenzoensis usually has no rattle, and both Crotalus ruber lucasensis and Crotalus estebanensis exhibit a tendency for rattle loss. The rattle may also be lacking in any species due to a congenital abnormality.

The rattle consists of a series of loosely interlocking hollow shells, each of which was at one point the scale covering the tip of the tail. In most other snakes, the tail tip, or terminal spine, is cone-shaped, hardly any thicker than the rest of the skin, and is shed along with it at each successive molt. In this case, however, the end scale, or "button", is much thicker and shaped like a bulb, with one or two annular constrictions to prevent it from falling off. Before each molt, a new button will have developed inside the last one and before the skin is shed off its body, the tip of new button shrinks, then loosening the shell of the previous one. This process continues so the succession of molts produces an appendage consisting of a number of interlocking segments that make an audible noise when vibrated. Since younger specimens may shed several times in a year at a frequency that depends on their environment and how much they eat, every time adding a new segment to the rattle, the number of segments is not just a function of the age of the snake. In theory, the rattle could become very long indeed, but in practice, the older segments tend to wear out and fall off. How quickly this happens depends on the snake's environment, but end segments tend to break off after the rattle becomes about six or seven segments long;  finding specimens with as many as a dozen segments is common. In captive specimens, however, as many as 29 segments have been found.

Distribution and habitat
The genus Crotalus is found in the Americas from southern Canada to central Argentina.

Behavior

No species of Crotalus is considered aggressive; when threatened, most retreat quickly, but most species defend themselves readily when cornered.

There is no consensus in the available literature about how far rattlesnakes can strike, with estimates ranging from one-third to the entire body length of the rattlesnake. Strike distance depends not just on the snake’s size, but also on many other factors, including its species, the position of its body, and its degree of excitement. This is compounded by a further lack of consensus as to the location on the anchor coil of the snake from where a strike should be measured. They rarely strike further than half of their body length, and almost never more than three-fourths, but trusting such values is unwise if only because it is not feasible to accurately judge the length of a coiled snake.

Feeding
The diets of species of Crotalus generally consist of vertebrates, although many invertebrate species have also been consumed. Smaller species feed mainly on lizards, while larger species start by feeding on lizards as juveniles and then switch to preying mainly on mammals as adults. Prey items more frequently taken include rabbits, ground squirrels, tree squirrels, chipmunks, prairie dogs, gophers, and rats and mice, while those less frequently taken include birds, snakes, and amphibians. Cannibalism has been reported in a number of different species. Individuals that feed on rodents usually release their prey after a strike to avoid their teeth, and these snakes evidently can discriminate between trails left by prey that has or has not been envenomated.

Predators
For all species of Crotalus, the most significant threats come from people, but they also face many natural enemies. These include other snakes, such as kingsnakes (Lampropeltis), coachwhips (Masticophis), indigo snakes (Drymarchon), and racers (Coluber); birds, such as hawks, eagles, owls, roadrunners, and ravens; and mammals, such as cats, coyotes, foxes, wildcats, badgers, skunks, and pigs. Certain species of birds frequently prey on these snakes, but this is not without risk. Two cases were reported in which dead hawks found near venomous snakes had suffered hemorrhage and gangrenous necrosis due to snakebite.

Reproduction
The genus Crotalus is ovoviviparous, giving birth to live young. The basic lifecycle of many Nearctic species has been known for quite some time. Females at an age of 26 months undergo vitellogenesis as they enter their third hibernation, mate the following spring, and give birth later in September or October.

Several variations to this basic cycle occur. In North America, the females of some species store sperm in their oviducts for at least eight months, and the males (all species of which undergo spermatogenesis during the summer) store sperm in the vas deferens for at least a year. Thus, species that store sperm for a shorter duration mate in the spring and store sperm in the vas deferens, while those that do so for a longer duration mate in the fall and store sperm in the oviduct over the winter, after which fertilization occurs the following spring. In addition, species that occur further north, where weather is colder during much of the year and the feeding and growing season is short, may reproduce only every other year or less. Those found in central and southern Mexico or the tropics have reproductive cycles that correspond mostly with the rainy season.

Venom
Two main hemotoxic effects are caused by rattlesnake venom. First, zinc-containing metalloproteases act upon capillary endothelial cells to cause platelet aggregation and hemorrhage. Second, the platelet antagonist crotalin creates a severe bleeding effect as it binds to the surface proteins, blocking aggregation.

Neurotoxic effects may also be caused by rattlesnake venom. These effects vary by species, and within species by population.

Species

*) Not including the nominate subspecies
T) Type species

See also
Snakebite

References

Further reading

Coues E (1875). "Synopsis of the Reptiles and Batrachians of Arizona; with Critical and Field Notes, and an Extensive Synonymy". pp. 585–633 [609]. In: Wheeler GM (1875). Report Upon Geographical and Geological Explorations and Surveys West of the One Hundredth Meridian. Volume V. Zoology: Reports Upon the Zoological Collections Obtained from Portions of Nevada, Utah, California, Colorado, New Mexico, and Arizona, During the Years 1871, 1872, 1873, and 1874. Washington, District of Columbia: United States Government Printing Office.
Fitzinger L (1843). Systema Reptilium. Fasciculus Primus. Amblyglossae. Vienna: Braumüller et Seidel. 106 pp. + indices [29]. (in Latin).
Gloyd HK (1940). "The Rattlesnakes, Genera Sistrurus and Crotalus. A Study in Zoogeography and Evolution". Special Publ. Chicago Acad. Sci. (4): 1-266, 10 figures, 31 plates.

Houttuyn, M (1764). Natuurlyke historie of uitvoerige beschryving der dieren, planten en mineraalen, volgens het samenstel van den Heer Linnæus. Met naauwkeurige afbeeldingen. Eerste deels, zesde stuk. Dieren van beiderley leven. Amsterdam. 558 pp. [290]. (in Dutch).
Hubbs, Brian; O'Connor, Brendan (2012). A Guide to the Rattlesnakes and other Venomous Serpents of the United States. Tempe, Arizona: Tricolor Books. 129 pp. .

Klauber LM (1971). "Classification, distribution and biology of the venomous snakes of northern Mexico, the United States and Canada: Crotalus and Sistrurus ". pp. 115–156. In: Bucherl W, Buckley E (1971). Venomous animals and their venoms, vol. 2. Venomous vertebrates. New York: Academic Press.
Klauber LM (1972). Rattlesnakes: Their habits, Life Histories, and Influence on Mankind. Second edition. 2 Volumes. Berkeley, California: University of California Press.
Laurenti JN (1768). Specimen medicum, exhibens synopsin reptilium emendatum cum experimentis circa venena et antidota reptilium austriacorum. Vienna: Joan. Thom. Nob. de Trattern. 214 pp. + Plates I-V [92]. (in Latin).
Linnaeus C (1758). Systema naturae per regna tria naturae secundum classes, ordines, genera, species, cum characteribus, differentiis, synonymis, locis. Tomus I. Editio Decima, Reformata [ Tenth Revised Edition,  Volume 1]. Stockholm. 824 pp. [214]. (in Latin).
Powell R, Conant R, Collins JT (2016). Peterson Field Guide to Reptiles and Amphibians of Eastern and Central North America, Fourth Edition. Boston and New York: Houghton Mifflin Harcourt. xiv + 494 pp. [438] + Plates 1-47. .
Rafinesque CS (1815). Analyse de la nature ou tableau de l'univers et des corps organisés. Palermo: Jean Barravecchia. 224 pp. (Herpetology section) pp. 73–78 [77]. (in French).
Rafinesque CS (1820). "Annals of Nature, or Annual Synopsys of New Genera and Species of Animals and Plants Discovered in North America". Lexington (22): 1-16 [5].
Reuss T (1930). "Glasnik Zemaljskog Muzeja u Bosni I Hercegovini ". Sveska za Prirodne Nauke 42: 57-114 [60, 88]. (in Bosnian).
Schmidt KP, Davis DD (1941). Field Book of Snakes of the United States and Canada. New York: G.P. Putnam's Sons. 365 pp. [290-293].
Wagler J (1830). Natürliches system der amphibien, mit vorangehender classification der Säugthiere und Vögel. Ein Beitrag zur vergleichenden Zoologie. Munich, Stuttgart and Tübingen: J.G. Cotta. vi + 354 pp. + one plate [176]. (in German and Latin).

 
Snake genera
Taxa named by Carl Linnaeus